Oligophagy refers to the eating of only a few specific foods, and to monophagy when restricted to a single food source. The term is usually associated with insect dietary behaviour. Organisms may exhibit narrow or specific oligophagy where the diet is restricted to a very few foods or broad oligophagy where the organism feeds on a wide variety of specific foods but none other.

Polyphagy, on the contrary, refers to eating a broad spectrum of foods. In the insect world it refers usually to insects that feed on plants belonging to different families.

Examples 
The diet of the yucca moths is restricted to the developing fruits of species of yucca while the sea hare, Aplysia juliana (Quoy & Gaimard), is found on and feeds only on a single alga, Ulva lactuca (Linnaeus) in east Australian waters. These are both narrow oligophages. Conversely the migratory locust may be said to be broadly oligophagous or even polyphagous.

Footnotes

References
  (1999). Ecological Entomology. 2nd Edition (illustrated). John Wiley and Sons. , . Limited preview on Google Books. Accessed 9 January 2010.
  (1994). "Factors associated with oligophagy in two species of sea hares (Mollusca: Anaspidea)". Journal of Experimental Marine Biology and Ecology, Volume 192, Issue 1, 17 October 1995, Pages 47–73. .

Eating behaviors
Insect behavior